Ammopolia is a genus of moths of the family Noctuidae.

Species
 Ammopolia witzenmanni (Standfuss, 1890)

References
 Ammopolia at Markku Savela's Lepidoptera and Some Other Life Forms
 Natural History Museum Lepidoptera genus database

Xyleninae
Noctuoidea genera